The University of Charleston Stadium at Laidley Field is an 18,500-capacity stadium located in downtown Charleston, West Virginia, near the West Virginia State Capitol complex. It features a FieldTurf playing field for football and facilities for track and field competitions.  The turf field is no longer suitable for soccer and lacrosse due to alterations to the track facilities.    

The University of Charleston Stadium is the home of the American football team of the Charleston Golden Eagles. It was finished in 1979, as a complete rebuild of a previous facility. It is owned by Kanawha County Schools.  In 2003, because the school board lacked funds to maintain the stadium, it entered into a joint venture with the private University of Charleston. UC invested over $1.5 million to replace the turf, add locker rooms and a skybox, and make other improvements in exchange for access and naming rights.  Originally the home field of Capital High School football after the consolidation Stonewall High School and Charleston High School.  Multiple middle school and community teams also play at the location. It hosts the state high school track and field championships. The field has also played host to multiple high school playoff games as well as being host to the State Championships before their move to Wheeling in the 90's. It also hosts the Gazette-Mail Kanawha County Majorette and Band Festival, an annual marching band festival held at the end of September. 

Record attendance for this stadium was set at a local high school contest, Charleston High School vs. Stonewall Jackson High School in the latter part of the 1980s, later to be locally called "The Game" of the century. Record attendance was set at over 21,000. Later, when Capital High and Riverside High met when both were undefeated and ranked 1 and 2 in the state, there again were over 20,000 in attendance.

References

American football venues in West Virginia
Soccer venues in West Virginia
Sports venues in West Virginia
College football venues
Buildings and structures in Charleston, West Virginia
Tourist attractions in Kanawha County, West Virginia
Sports venues completed in 1979
1979 establishments in West Virginia